Mangatainoka is a small settlement in the Tararua District of New Zealand's North Island.

Mangatainoka is home to the nationally famous Tui Brewery which provides brewery tours, lunches and a garden bar open late morning until late afternoon. It also has a golf course.

Geography

The statistical area surrounds but does not include the towns of Woodville and Pahiatua.

Demography

Mangatainoka had a population of 1,743 at the 2018 New Zealand census, a decrease of 6 people (-0.3%) since the 2013 census, and a decrease of 9 people (-0.5%) since the 2006 census. There were 678 households. There were 888 males and 855 females, giving a sex ratio of 1.04 males per female. The median age was 42.3 years (compared with 37.4 years nationally), with 360 people (20.7%) aged under 15 years, 279 (16.0%) aged 15 to 29, 858 (49.2%) aged 30 to 64, and 246 (14.1%) aged 65 or older.

Ethnicities were 92.6% European/Pākehā, 14.5% Māori, 1.0% Pacific peoples, 1.7% Asian, and 0.9% other ethnicities (totals add to more than 100% since people could identify with multiple ethnicities).

The proportion of people born overseas was 7.7%, compared with 27.1% nationally.

Although some people objected to giving their religion, 49.9% had no religion, 38.6% were Christian, 0.2% were Muslim and 2.8% had other religions.

Of those at least 15 years old, 198 (14.3%) people had a bachelor or higher degree, and 327 (23.6%) people had no formal qualifications. The median income was $32,700, compared with $31,800 nationally. The employment status of those at least 15 was that 771 (55.7%) people were employed full-time, 225 (16.3%) were part-time, and 42 (3.0%) were unemployed.

Economy

In 2018, 7.2% worked in manufacturing, 6.0% worked in construction, 3.3% worked in hospitality, 3.6% worked in transport, 6.9% worked in education, and 8.1% worked in healthcare.

Transportation

As of 2018, among those who commute to work, 55.9% drove a car, 2.4% rode in a car, 0.6% use a bike, and 0.6% walk or run. No one commuted by public transport.

Mangatainoka railway station and railway line opened to Mangatainoka in August 1897 and the settlement was briefly the terminus of the Wairarapa Line until the final section to a junction with the Palmerston North–Gisborne Line in Woodville was opened on 11 December 1897.  Passenger train services were originally provided by the Napier Express until it was re-routed via the former Wellington and Manawatu Railway Company's western line through the Kapiti Coast and Horowhenua in early 1909.

It was replaced by the Wairarapa Mail, which served Mangatainoka until 1948, when it was fully replaced by the NZR RM Wairarapa class railcars that had begun operating some services in 1936. Standard and 88 seater class railcars also operated to Mangatainoka, especially after the Wairarapa railcars were withdrawn in the wake of the Rimutaka Incline's 1955 closure. Carriage trains through Mangatainoka were reintroduced in 1964 but did not fully replace the railcars until 1977.

As roads in the area improved through the 1980s, passenger numbers declined and all services north of Masterton ceased on 29 July 1988. Since this time, only freight trains have regularly operated through Mangatainoka; passenger services have been limited to occasional excursions, typically organised by enthusiast societies.

Education

References

Further reading 

 

Tararua District
Wairarapa
Populated places in the Wellington Region
Populated places in Manawatū-Whanganui